Antoine Xavier Adams (born 31 August 1988) is a Saint Kitts and Nevis sprinter who specialises in the 200 metres.
Adams helped win a bronze medal as a part of the 4 × 100 m relay team at the 2011 World Championships in Daegu, South Korea.

Born 31 August 1988, in Cayon Antoine Adams excelled in Track & Field in his early years leading up to high school. Upon graduating Cayon High School he attended The Clarence Fitzroy Bryant College but left after a couple months. Antoine decided to further his track career and registered for community college in Houston and later met his coach Eric Francis. In 2013 at the CAC Championships in Morelia, Adams broke the 200 National Record of St. Kitts and Nevis, bringing it down to 20.13s.

Personal bests

International competitions

1: Disqualified in the semifinal.

References

External links
 
 
 
 
 
 
 
 
 

1988 births
Living people
Saint Kitts and Nevis male sprinters
Olympic athletes of Saint Kitts and Nevis
Athletes (track and field) at the 2012 Summer Olympics
Athletes (track and field) at the 2011 Pan American Games
Athletes (track and field) at the 2015 Pan American Games
Saint Kitts and Nevis
Pan American Games bronze medalists for Saint Kitts and Nevis
Pan American Games medalists in athletics (track and field)
Commonwealth Games competitors for Saint Kitts and Nevis
Athletes (track and field) at the 2010 Commonwealth Games
Athletes (track and field) at the 2014 Commonwealth Games
World Athletics Championships athletes for Saint Kitts and Nevis
World Athletics Championships medalists
Athletes (track and field) at the 2016 Summer Olympics
Medalists at the 2011 Pan American Games
Medalists at the 2015 Pan American Games